Dushelan is a rural locality (a selo) in Barguzinsky District, Republic of Buryatia, Russia. The population was 171 as of 2010. There are 4 streets.

Geography 
Dushelan is located 31 km east of Barguzin (the district's administrative centre) by road. Uro is the nearest rural locality.

References 

Rural localities in Barguzinsky District